The Alan Turing Centenary Conference was an academic conference celebrating the life and research of Alan Turing by bringing together distinguished scientists to understand and analyse the history and development of Computer Science and Artificial intelligence.

The conference was organised by Andrei Voronkov and hosted by the School of Computer Science, University of Manchester where Turing worked from 1948 until 1954. It ran from June 22 to June 25, 2012 as part of Alan Turing Year in Manchester Town Hall.

Keynote speakers
Several of the keynote speakers for the conference were distinguished Turing Award winners including:

 Rodney Brooks, Massachusetts Institute of Technology
 Fred Brooks, University of North Carolina Turing Award winner
 Vint Cerf, Google, Turing Award winner
 Edmund M. Clarke, Carnegie Mellon University, Turing Award winner
 Jack Copeland, University of Canterbury
 George Ellis, University of Cape Town, Templeton Prize winner
 David Ferrucci, IBM TJ Watson Research Center Principal Investigator of the  Watson/Jeopardy! project
 Tony Hoare, Microsoft Research, Turing Award winner
 Garry Kasparov, Kasparov Chess Foundation
 Samuel Klein, Trustee of the Wikimedia Foundation and a Director of the One Laptop per Child Foundation.
 Donald Knuth, Stanford University, Turing Award winner
 Yuri Matiyasevich, Institute of Mathematics, St. Petersburgh
 Hans Meinhardt, Max Planck Institute for Developmental Biology
 Roger Penrose, University of Oxford, Wolf Prize winner
 Michael O. Rabin, Harvard University, Turing Award winner
 Adi Shamir, Weizmann Institute of Science, Turing Award winner
 Leslie Valiant, Harvard University, Turing Award winner
 Manuela M. Veloso, Carnegie Mellon University
 Andrew Yao, Tsinghua University, Turing Award winner

Panelists
There were a wide range of panels during the conference chaired by:

Samson Abramsky, University of Oxford
Ronald J. Brachman, Yahoo! Labs
Martin Davis, New York University
Steve Furber, University of Manchester
Carole Goble, University of Manchester
Pat Hayes, Florida Institute for Human and Machine Cognition
Bertrand Meyer, ETH Zurich
Moshe Y. Vardi, Rice University

Sponsors
The conference was sponsored by the Kurt Gödel Society, the John Templeton Foundation, the Artificial Intelligence (journal), Google, the Office of Naval Research, Microsoft
and IOS Press.

References

2012 in England
2012 conferences
Computer science conferences
Department of Computer Science, University of Manchester
Alan Turing